Gustavus Sessinghaus (November 8, 1838 – November 16, 1887) was a U.S. Representative from Missouri.

Born in Koela, Prussia, Sessinghaus pursued preparatory studies.
Immigrated to the United States and settled in St. Louis, Missouri.
During the Civil War served as a private in Company A, Fifth Regiment, United States Reserve Corps, Missouri Volunteer Infantry.
He served as member of the school board 1878-1880.
He successfully contested as a Republican the election of Richard G. Frost to the Forty-seventh Congress and served two days only, (March 2, 1883 – March 3, 1883).
He was an unsuccessful candidate for reelection in 1882 to the Forty-eighth Congress.
He engaged in the milling business.
He died in St. Louis, Missouri on November 16, 1887 and was interred at Bellefontaine Cemetery.

References

External links 
 

1838 births
1887 deaths
Prussian emigrants to the United States
Union Army soldiers
School board members in Missouri
Republican Party members of the United States House of Representatives from Missouri
19th-century American politicians
Politicians from St. Louis
Burials at Bellefontaine Cemetery